Enter the Dragon is a soundtrack album to the motion picture of the same name by Argentine composer, pianist and conductor Lalo Schifrin recorded in 1973 and released on the Warner Bros. label.

Reception
The Allmusic review states "The opening "Theme from Enter the Dragon" is unquestionably a product of its time. While the tune is occasionally infused with Eastern-sounding chords and instrumental voicings, the adrenaline-pumping proto-funk backbeat is drenched in wah-wah guitar, dramatic brass interjections and (presumably) Lee's intimidating Kiai (battle cry) vocalizations. With the notable exception of the reprise of the "Theme From...," the remaining eight selections primarily consist of mood-enhancing sounds to accompany rather than react to—the action taking place on screen".

The soundtrack album sold over 500,000 copies.

Track listing

Personnel
Lalo Schifrin - arranger, conductor
John Audino, Tony Terran, Eugene E. Young - trumpet
Dick Noel, Hoyt Bohannon, Dick Nash, George Roberts - trombone
Vincent DeRosa, James Decker, Richard Perissi - French horn
Ronnie Lang, Sheridon Stokes, Jerome Richardson, John Ellis, Jack Marsh - reeds
Clare Fischer, Ralph Grierson, Joe Sample - keyboards
Al Vescovo, Bernie Lewis, Larry Carlton, Tommy Tedesco, Dennis Budimer, Peter Woodford, Bob Bain - guitar
Max Bennett - bass
Stix Hooper - drums, percussion
Larry Bunker, Emil Richards, Joe Porcaro, Ken Watson, Robert Zimmitti, Francisco Aguabella - percussion
Israel Baker, Howard Griffin, Anatol Kaminsky, Joseph Livoti, Joseph Livoti, Jerome Reisler, George Kast, Herman Clebanoff, Gerald Vinci, Alex Beller, Bonnie Douglas, Paul Shure, Alfred Lustgarten, Erno Neufeld - violin
Sam Ross, Myra Kestenbaum, Virginia Majewski, Allan Harshman, Rollice Dale - viola
Raphael Kramer, Kurt Reher, Eleanor Slatkin, Frederick Seyhora - cello
Dorothy Remsen harp
Kurt Wolff - contractor
Dick Hazard - arranger

References

1973 soundtrack albums
Warner Records soundtracks
Lalo Schifrin soundtracks
Film scores
Albums arranged by Lalo Schifrin
Albums conducted by Lalo Schifrin
Albums arranged by Richard Hazard